Magdalena Maria Kochan (born 28 January 1950 in Szczecin) is a Polish politician. She was elected to the Sejm on 25 September 2005, getting 6294 votes in 41 Szczecin district as a candidate from the Civic Platform list.

See also
Members of Polish Sejm 2005-2007

References

1950 births
Civic Platform politicians
Living people
Women members of the Sejm of the Republic of Poland
Women members of the Senate of Poland
Politicians from Szczecin
21st-century Polish women politicians
Members of the Polish Sejm 2005–2007
Members of the Polish Sejm 2007–2011
Members of the Polish Sejm 2011–2015
Members of the Polish Sejm 2015–2019
Members of the Senate of Poland 2019–2023